François Robert Bacqué (born 2 September 1936) is a French prelate of the Catholic Church who spent his career in the diplomatic service of the Holy See, fulfilling several assignments as an apostolic nuncio.

Biography
François Robert Bacqué was born in Bordeaux, France, on 2 September 1936 and ordained a priest of the Archdiocese of Bordeaux on 1 October 1966. He completed a year of pastoral work at the parish of Notre-Dame d'Arcachon.

He studied in Rome, Paris, and Toulouse, earning degrees in canon law and political science, and completed the course of studies at the Pontifical Ecclesiastical Academy in 1967 and entered the diplomatic service of the Holy See in 1969. His early assignments included stints in the papal representatives' offices in China (1967–72), the Netherlands (1972–75), and Chile (1975–78); in Rome at the Secretariat of State and as a members of the Council for Public Affairs of the Church (1978–83); and then at the apostolic nunciatures in Portugal (1981–85) and Scandinavia (1985–88). In Chile he served under the nuncio Angelo Sodano, later Secretary of State, during the military dictatorship of Augusto Pinochet. Bacqué has defended Sodano's record there, noting that the nunciature sheltered about thirty political refugees.

Pope John Paul II appointed him titular archbishop of Gradisca and Apostolic Pro-Nuncio to Sri Lanka on 17 June 1988. He received his episcopal consecration on 3 September 1988 from Cardinal Agostino Casaroli, the Secretary of State.

Pope John Paul named him Apostolic Nuncio to the Dominican Republic on 7 June 1994 and on 27 February 2001 Apostolic Nuncio to the Netherlands.

He retired upon the appointment of his successor in the Netherlands, André Dupuy, on 15 December 2011.

See also
 List of heads of the diplomatic missions of the Holy See

References
 

Living people
1936 births
Clergy from Bordeaux
Pontifical Ecclesiastical Academy alumni
Apostolic Nuncios to Sri Lanka
Apostolic Nuncios to the Dominican Republic
Apostolic Nuncios to the Netherlands
French expatriates in Italy
French expatriates in China
French expatriates in the Netherlands
French expatriates in Chile
French expatriates in Portugal
French expatriates in Sri Lanka
Recipients of the Order pro Merito Melitensi